This is a record of Israel at the IAAF World Championships in Athletics. Israel has won three medals at the World Championships of Athletics.

Israeli Aleksandr Averbukh, won the bronze in 1999, and the silver in 2001.

Their third medal came in 2015. Former Ukrainian Hanna Knyazyeva-Minenko made a big improvement to her own National Record of her new country Israel with a 14.78. Her lead lasted through two jumpers before Ibargüen took the lead with her second round 14.80. Knyazyeva-Minenko's medal was the first World Championship medal for an Israeli woman.

Medal tables

Medals by year

Medals by sport

List of medalists

References

Israel at the World Championships in Athletics
Nations at the World Athletics Championships
Athletics in Israel